is a river in Hokkaidō, Japan. The river is a class A river.

In the Ainu language Chitose was originally called shikot, meaning big depression or hollow, like Lake Shikotsu a caldera lake. To the Japanese, this sounded too much like , so it was changed to Chitose. The name of the river was changed in 1805.

Course

The Chitose River is the outflow of Lake Shikotsu. From the lake the river flows through a series of power plants owned by the Oji Paper Company. The Chitose River flows through the center of the city of Chitose, before entering the Ishikari Plain. On the plain, the river feeds and is fed by numerous irrigation canals. Here the Chitose River forms part of the border between Ishikari and Sorachi Subprefectures. Finally, the river passes through the city of Ebetsu before it flows into the Ishikari River.

Flooding
National, prefectural, and local governments have been adopting numerous measures to try to reduce the severity of the flooding.

References

External links 

 Geographical Survey Institute

Rivers of Hokkaido
Rivers of Japan